Varzi is a comune (municipality) in the Province of Pavia in the Italian region Lombardy, located about 70 km south of Milan and about 40 km south of Pavia.

Varzi borders the following municipalities: Bagnaria, Fabbrica Curone, Gremiasco, Menconico, Ponte Nizza, Romagnese, Santa Margherita di Staffora, Val di Nizza, Valverde, Zavattarello.

Main sights
Among the religious buildings in town are:
 Chiesa dei Cappuccini.
 Chiesa dei Rossi.
 Tempio della Fraternità di Cella.

References

External links
 Official website